The Kenya Open, currently titled as the Magical Kenya Open for sponsorship reasons, is a professional golf tournament in Kenya founded in 1967.

History
The Kenya Open was an associate event on the Far East Circuit in 1967 and 1968, after which it became a cornerstone of the emerging Safari Circuit – a collection of tournaments initially in Kenya and Zambia, and then later in Nigeria, Ivory Coast and Zimbabwe. The European Tour, who had taken over running of the Safari Tour in the late 1970s, began to expand globally through the 1980s and those events formally became part of the second tier Challenge Tour in 1991. With the exception of the 1994 event, the Kenya Open remained on the Challenge Tour schedule until 2019 when it was elevated to the elite European Tour schedule.

In 2019, the tournament became a European Tour event and was played in mid-March during the same week as The Players Championship on the PGA Tour.

The tournament has always been held near Nairobi, either at Muthaiga Golf Club (1967, 1969–2002, 2009–2012, 2017–2018, 2022) or at Karen Country Club (1968, 2004–2008, 2013–2016, 2019, 2021).

The title has been won by some of Europe's Ryder Cup golfers, including Seve Ballesteros, Ian Woosnam, Ken Brown, Edoardo Molinari and Christy O'Connor Jnr, as well as future Masters champion Trevor Immelman. The most successful player is Maurice Bembridge, who recorded three victories between 1968 and 1979.

Winners

Notes

References

External links
Coverage on the European Tour's official site
Coverage on the Challenge Tour's official site

European Tour events
Former Challenge Tour events
Safari Circuit events
Golf tournaments in Kenya
Sport in Nairobi
Recurring sporting events established in 1967
1967 establishments in Kenya